OH-4 may refer to:

 Ohio's 4th congressional district
 Original military designation of the Bell 206.
 Ohio State Route 4